Obba Babatundé (born Donald Cohen; December 1, 1951) is an American actor. A native of Queens, New York City, he has appeared in more than seventeen stage productions, thirty theatrical films, sixty made-for-television films, and two prime-time series.

Early life and education 
Babatundé was born in Jamaica, Queens, New York City. As a child, he attended public schools. He was attracted early to theater and from a young age would sing, dance and act for his family. He attended Jamaica High School where he was a well-rounded student who, in addition to appearing in the Sing '68 school musical program, was a student aide and a member of both the track and cross country teams. After graduating from Jamaica High School in 1969, he started teaching at a private school for students of color. He also pursued acting jobs in New York, gaining some roles Off-Off-Broadway.

Learning that his ancestry included people from Nigeria, he adopted a name made of Yoruba words: Obba, for "king", and Babatunde, meaning "father has returned again."

Acting career 
Babatundé has said a breakthrough role was gaining a part in a 1976 touring company of Guys and Dolls, starring Leslie Uggams and Richard Roundtree. Since then he has performed in many other stage productions.

His first Broadway performance was in Timbuktu! in 1978. 
He performed with Liza Minnelli in the documentary film “Liza In New Orleans” in 1980. He is known for starring as the original C.C. White in Dreamgirls, for which he was nominated for a 1982 Tony Award as Best Featured Actor in a Musical. After performing on Broadway in this role, he also toured for two years with the company. He gradually moved into film and television work, and has had numerous roles in both genres.

Film 
His feature film appearances include Life as Willie, The Celestine Prophecy, Material Girls, After the Sunset, The Manchurian Candidate, The Notebook, a SWAT captain in John Q, an attorney in Philadelphia (1993), The Last Fall, If I Tell You I Have To Kill You, The Fallen Faithful, Trapped, Tension, and Kinky.

He also played Dean Cain in the film How High, as well as the role of Willie Long in Life, Lamar in That Thing You Do!, and Mayor Denny in Santa Paws 2: The Santa Pups.

Television 
Babatundé has appeared in three prime-time series: CBS' Madam Secretary, as Barton Royce in the Showtime's I'm Dying Up Here (2017), and as Dean Fairbanks in Netflix's Dear White People (2017–2018).

Babatundé appeared in a recurring role on Kingdom and Amazon's Hand of God, as Bishop Bruce Congdon. He also appeared in Half & Half, as well as appearances on The Bold and the Beautiful, Boston Legal, Grey's Anatomy, NCIS, Cold Case, Strong Medicine, The Fresh Prince of Bel-Air, Touched by an Angel, Chicago Hope, Any Day Now, Karen Sisco, Dawson's Creek, and Friends.  In the 1998 miniseries, The Temptations, he played Berry Gordy, the founder of Motown Records.

Babatundé appeared as Daniel Harrelson Sr., the father of Shemar Moore's character in the 2017 series S.W.A.T..

Other ventures

Voice acting 
Babatundé's voice acting roles in animated films and games include Lando Calrissian in Star Wars: Galactic Battlegrounds, Star Wars: Rogue Squadron II: Rogue Leader, Star Wars: Rogue Squadron III: Rebel Strike, and Disney Infinity 3.0 as well as Conroy in Rocket Power. In the animated feature The Wild Thornberrys Movie, Babatundé voiced the character of Boko, and in the 2016 Air Bud Entertainment film Pup Star, he played the soul-singing Basset Hound, Big Ears.

Producer and director 
Babatundé was co-producer and director of Oscar's Black Odyssey, co-producer of Dorothy Dandridge: An American Beauty, and co-producer of TV in Black: The First 50 Years. He is associate producer of the horror film Voodoo Dolls and executive producer of Journey. Most recently, Babatundé directed and co-stars with Katt Williams in the Lionsgate Home Entertainment feature film American Bad Boy, and he produced and directed the short film Clarissa's Gift.

Babatundé also directed a version of the Broadway musical Dreamgirls. He co-authored, directed, and produced In the Blink of an Eye.

Singing 
Some of his recorded works include singing the title track on the Onaje Allan Gumbs's album Sack Full of Dreams, and "The Gal That Got Away" on Over The Rainbow, the Harold Arlen soundtrack.

In 1982 Babatunde starred as Zodzetrick in the Houston Grand Opera's second production of Scott Joplin's opera Treemonisha. They had produced it first in 1976. After the opera was rediscovered, the world premiere was produced in 1972 by the Atlanta Symphony Orchestra and Morehouse College chorus.

Awards and nominations 
In 2016, Babatundé received the Daytime Emmy Award for "Outstanding Guest Performer in a Drama Series", as well as the Lifetime Achievement Award from the Peachtree Village International Film Festival.

In 2010, Babatundé won NAACP Theatre Awards' "Best Lead Male" for his portrayal of Sammy Davis, Jr. in the Old Globe production of the musical Sammy.

Babatundé was nominated for an Emmy in the HBO film Miss Evers' Boys, an NAACP Image Award in the HBO film Introducing Dorothy Dandridge, and an Ovation Award and a Tony Award for his role as C.C. White in the original Broadway cast of Dreamgirls. He won an NAACP Image Award as "Best Actor" for his role as Sarge in A Soldiers Play.

Filmography

Film

Television

Video games

References

External links 

 
 
 

1951 births
Living people
African-American male actors
American male film actors
American male soap opera actors
American male stage actors
American male television actors
American male voice actors
American people of Nigerian descent
American people of Yoruba descent
Daytime Emmy Award for Outstanding Guest Performer in a Drama Series winners
Daytime Emmy Award winners
Male actors from New York City
People from Jamaica, Queens
Yoruba male actors
20th-century American male actors
21st-century American male actors
20th-century African-American people
21st-century African-American people